Rahimah Rahim may refer to:

 Rahimah Rahim (singer, born 1955), singer from Singapore
 Rahimah Rahim (singer, born 1992), Singaporean student and singer from Leicester